Luis María Pescetti (born January 15, 1958) is an Argentinian novelist, essayist, musician and actor.

Career
He received the Casa de las Américas Prize in 1997, The White Ravens award in the years 1998, 2001, and 2005 (given by the Internationale Jugendbibliothek) and three premios Gardel. In 2010 he gave a TED conference on humor, childhood and identity. That same year he was awarded with the Latin Grammy Award to Best Latin Children's Album, and the ALIJA Great Prize (IBBY Argentina) for his book Cartas al Rey de la Cabina (Letters to the King of the Cabin, still unpublished in English). In 2011 he was given the Konex Award for his work in the field of children and youth literature and music.

Works

Children's books

Marito y el temible Puf vuelven a ganar otra vez
¡¡¡Natacha!!!
El pulpo está crudo
Naranjas y marcianos
Caperucita Roja (tal como se lo contaron a Jorge)
Historias de los señores Moc y Poc
Natacha
Frin
La tarea según Natacha
¡Padrísimo, Natacha!
Mamá, ¿por qué nadie es como nosotros?
Nadie te creería
Chat, Natacha, chat
Bituín bituín Natacha
La Mona Risa
Lejos de Frin
Querido diario
No quiero ir a dormir
La enciclopedia de las Chicas Perla
Te amo, lectura (Natacha)

Adult books

¡Qué fácil es estar en pareja! (18.379 consejos básicos)
El ciudadano de mis zapatos
Neuróticos on line
La vida y otros síntomas
Copyright. Plagios literarios y poder político al desnudo

For teachers

Juegos de lectura en voz alta
Taller de animación y juegos musicales
Taller de animación musical y juegos
La fábrica de chistes

Discography

El vampiro negro (1999)
Casette pirata (2001)
Antología de Luis Pescetti (2003)
Bocasucia (2004)
Qué público de porquería (2005)
Inútil insistir (2008)
 Cartas al Rey de la Cabina (2010)
 Tengo mal comportamiento (2011)
 Él empezó primero (2013)
 Nuevas Cartas Al Rey de la Cabina y Anita, Mi Amor (2016)
 Textos Tecleados (2017)
 Queridos (Live) (2017)
 Magia Todo El Día (2018)
 Natasha: La Música (2018)
 Lío (2021)

Videos
 No quiero ir a dormir
 Luis te ve
 Cartas al Rey de la Cabina

References

External links
 

1958 births
Living people
Argentine essayists
Male essayists
Argentine musicians
Argentine male novelists
Latin Grammy Award winners